The 2013 County Championship Shield was the 9th version of the annual English rugby union County Championship, organized by the RFU for the tier 3 English counties.  Each county drew its players from rugby union clubs from the fifth tier and below of the English rugby union league system.  The counties were divided into three pools of four teams each, based roughly on regional lines, with the winner of each group plus the best runner-up going through to the semi-finals, with the winners of those games meeting in the final held at Twickenham Stadium. Typically there is no promotion or relegation out of or into the County Championship Shield.  Surrey were the reigning champions.

After winning their pools and semi-final matches, reigning champions Surrey met Cumbria in the final.  Having thrashed Leicestershire the last time round, Surrey found Cumbria a much tougher prospect, eventually prevailing 23 – 16 to claim their second successive title (and third overall).

Competition format
The competition format consisted of four pools (one of four teams, the others with three), based roughly on regional lines where possible, with each team playing each other once. The top side of each group qualified for the semi-finals, with the winners of the semi-finals playing in the final held at Twickenham Stadium on 26 May 2013.  As the lowest tier in the county championship there is no relegation while promotion is not given every season, although outstanding county performances can lead to counties moving up to tier 2.

Participating counties and ground locations

Notes

Group stage

Pool 1

Round 1

Round 2

Round 3

Pool 2

Round 1

Round 2

Round 3

Pool 3

Round 1

Round 2

Round 3

Pool 4

Round 1

Round 2

Round 3

Knock-out Stage

Semi-finals

Final

See also
 English rugby union system
 Rugby union in England

References

External links
 NCA Rugby

2013
2012–13 County Championship